Himalay Putra is a 1997 Indian Hindi-language romance film directed by Pankaj Parashar, starring Vinod Khanna, Hema Malini, Johnny Lever, Satish Shah, Danny Denzongpa, Amrish Puri and Rocky Grover. It introduced Akshaye Khanna, Anjala Zaveri and Shazia Malik. It was the only time Vinod Khanna and his son Akshaye Khanna appeared in a film together.

Plot
Himalay Putra (the son of the Himalayas) starts with the love story of Suraj (Vinod Khanna) and Seema (Hema Malini) and the immortal wall of disparity of status standing between themselves and their union. Seema being the daughter of a rich businessman and Suraj being a police inspector with a modest income, are destined to face the objection of Seema's father (Amrish Puri) to their marriage. Amrish creates misunderstanding in Seema's heart for Suraj and she starts looking upon him as a greedy person who discarded her love for the sake of money. But the problem is that she has already got pregnant through him and after the demise of her father, she moves to the region of the Himalayas, giving birth to Abhay (Akshaye Khanna).

Abhay grows up misunderstanding his father by learning his mother's version of the past events. He is a devotee of Lord Shiva and Seema, instead of telling him (and the world) about his father, prefers to call him as Himalay Putra (the son of the Himalayas). He falls in love with Esha (Anjala Zaveri) who is the daughter of their neighbour — Major Mathur (Satish Shah) but love is less important for him. What is more important for him is to locate his father and settle scores with him for his mother's sorrows.

And then one day, he comes across him. Suraj has now become the Assistant Commissioner of Police and is on the trail of a gang of smugglers headed by Rana (Danny Dengzongpa). He saves the life of Suraj and both come on good terms accordingly. When Abhay brings Suraj to his home and introduces him to his mother, both of his parents are stunned to see each other after a long time gap of two decades. However, they prefer not to disclose their relationship to Abhay. But as the destiny has it, the activities of the smugglers' gang create such a situation that Abhay learns that Suraj is his father. The movie ends with the removal of misunderstanding in the hearts of Seema and Abhay about Suraj and the happy union of all.

Cast
Vinod Khanna as ACP Suraj Khanna, Abhay's father.
Hema Malini as Seema Malhotra, Abhay's mother.
Akshaye Khanna as Abhay Khanna
Anjala Zaveri as Esha Mathur 
Shazia Malik as Ruby
Johnny Lever as Joe
Satish Shah as Major Mathur, Esha's father.
Danny Denzongpa as Narsingh Rana
Amrish Puri as Mr. Malhotra, Seema's father (special appearance)
Rocky Grover as Vicky
Nandita Thakur as Doctor
Puneet Vashisht as Abhay’s friend

Music
The music of the movie has been composed by Anu Malik. Songs like "Na Wo Inkar Karti Hai" and "Kaga Sab Tan Khaiyo" became popular among the masses.
 "Bam Bam Bhole": Kavita Krishnamurthy, Udit Narayan & Shankar Mahadevan
 "I Am A Bachelor": Vinod Rathod
 "Ishq Hua Tujhse Janam": Alka Yagnik & Udit Narayan
 "Kaga Sab Tan Khaiyo": Alka Yagnik & Sonu Nigam
 "Na Who Inkar Karti Hai": Alka Yagnik & Udit Narayan
 "Tune Kaisa Jadoo Kiya": Alka Yagnik & Udit Narayan
 "Kithe Nain Na Jodi": Alka Yagnik & Sonu Nigam

References

External links

1997 films
1990s Hindi-language films
Indian action drama films
Films scored by Anu Malik
Films directed by Pankuj Parashar
1990s action drama films